Dejan Trajkovski (born 14 April 1992) is a Slovenian footballer who plays as a left-back for Italian  club Vibonese.

Club career
Trajkovski signed with Spartak Trnava on 1 February 2021, after being without a club for a year and a half. However, he was released by Spartak in December of the same year.

International career
Trajkovski got his first call up to the senior Slovenia squad for the UEFA Euro 2016 qualifier against San Marino in October 2015. He debuted for the team one year later, on 11 November 2016 against Malta.

Personal life
He has a twin brother named Tadej who is also a footballer, playing as a goalkeeper.

Honours
Maribor
Slovenian PrvaLiga: 2011–12, 2012–13, 2013–14
Slovenian Cup: 2011–12, 2012–13
Slovenian Supercup: 2012, 2013, 2014

Zrinjski Mostar
Bosnian Premier League: 2021–22

References

External links
NZS profile 

1992 births
Living people
Slovenian twins
Slovenian people of Macedonian descent
Sportspeople from Maribor
Slovenian footballers
Slovenia youth international footballers
Slovenia under-21 international footballers
Slovenia international footballers
Slovenian expatriate footballers
Association football fullbacks
NK Maribor players
NK Domžale players
FC Twente players
Jong FC Twente players
Puskás Akadémia FC players
FC Spartak Trnava players
FC Petržalka players
HŠK Zrinjski Mostar players
U.S. Vibonese Calcio players
Slovenian PrvaLiga players
Eredivisie players
Derde Divisie players
Nemzeti Bajnokság I players
Slovak Super Liga players
2. Liga (Slovakia) players
Premier League of Bosnia and Herzegovina players
Serie D players
Slovenian expatriate sportspeople in the Netherlands
Expatriate footballers in the Netherlands
Slovenian expatriate sportspeople in Hungary
Expatriate footballers in Hungary
Slovenian expatriate sportspeople in Slovakia
Expatriate footballers in Slovakia
Slovenian expatriate sportspeople in Bosnia and Herzegovina
Expatriate footballers in Bosnia and Herzegovina
Slovenian expatriate sportspeople in Italy
Expatriate footballers in Italy